Team Pro Feminin Les Carroz was a French professional cycling team, which competed in elite road bicycle racing events such as the UCI Women's Road World Cup.

National champions
2008
 France Road Race, Jeannie Longo-Ciprelli
 France Time Trial, Jeannie Longo-Ciprelli

References

Cycling teams based in France
UCI Women's Teams
Cycling teams established in 2008